The Sullavan Brothers is a British television series which originally aired on ITV between 1964 and 1965. One episode, "Insufficient Evidence", is believed to be lost.

Cast

Main
 Hugh Manning as Robert Sullavan
 Anthony Bate as Paul Sullavan
 David Sumner as Patrick Sullavan
 Tenniel Evans as John Sullavan
 Mary Kenton as Beth Sullavan
 Wendy Varnals as Anne Welsh
 A.J. Brown as Mr. Justice Ryner

Other
A variety of other actors appeared in episodes of the series including George Baker, Dulcie Gray, Ian McShane, John Alderton, John Barrie, Mervyn Johns, Jo Rowbottom, Michael Ripper, Norman Bird, Desmond Llewelyn, Avice Landone, Donald Sutherland, Billy Milton, Norman Mitchell, Morris Perry, Jean Anderson, Ray Brooks, Peter Sallis, T.P. McKenna, Tim Preece, Bill Shine, Bryan Pringle, Lockwood West, Wensley Pithey, Lennard Pearce, Lawrence Dane, Gerard Heinz, Graham Crowden, Janina Faye, Sheila Keith, Charles Lloyd Pack, Ronald Leigh-Hunt, Peter Barkworth, Eric Dodson, Judy Cornwell, Josephine Tewson, Norman Rodway, Bruce Boa, Richard Pearson, Cyril Raymond, Garfield Morgan, James Cossins, Claire Davenport, Robert Raglan, Wendy Richard, John Horsley and Windsor Davies.

References

Bibliography
 Vahimagi, Tise . British Television: An Illustrated Guide. Oxford University Press, 1996.

External links
 

1964 British television series debuts
1965 British television series endings
1960s British drama television series
ITV television dramas
English-language television shows
Television shows produced by Associated Television (ATV)